Hwang Sun-woo (born May 13, 2003) is a South Korean swimmer.

Career
On May 14, 2021, he established the new Korean national record of 48.04 in the 100m freestyle and then followed up with a new World Junior Record in the men's 200m freestyle.

In July 2021, he represented South Korea at the 2020 Summer Olympics held in Tokyo, Japan. He was the flagbearer for South Korea together with Kim Yeon-koung. He competed in the 50m freestyle, 100m freestyle, 200m freestyle and 4 × 200m freestyle relay events. In the 50m freestyle heats event, he did not advance to compete in the semifinal. In the remaining freestyle heats events, he completed at rank 1 for 100m and rank 6 for 200m, allowing him to advance to compete in the semifinal. In the freestyle semifinal events, he completed at rank 4 for 100m and rank 6 for 200m, allowing him to advance to compete in the final. In the freestyle final events, he completed at rank 5 for 100m and rank 6 for 200m. In the freestyle relay event, the team did not advance to compete in the final.

At the 2022 World Championships, Hwang won silver medal in the Men's 200-metre freestyle. In the final, on 20 June, he finished 1:44.47

In December 2022, he won gold in the Men's 200 metre freestyle event at the 2022 short course FINA World Swimming Championships (25m) with a time of 1:39.72, beating the previous Championship record that was set by Lithuania’s Danas Rapsys in 2018, as well as setting a new Asian record.

Honours

Other 
 19th Korea Image Awards (2023) – Korea Image Budding Youth Award

Reference

External links
 
 

2003 births
Living people
South Korean male freestyle swimmers
Swimmers at the 2020 Summer Olympics
Olympic swimmers of South Korea
People from Suwon
Sportspeople from Gyeonggi Province
World Aquatics Championships medalists in swimming
Medalists at the FINA World Swimming Championships (25 m)
21st-century South Korean people